Erganian (Western Armenian Յակոբեան) is an Armenian surname

The surname may refer to:
 Leslie Erganian is an American artist and author. 
 Sarkis Erganian (1870 - 1950) was an Ottoman Armenian painter.

See also 
Aram Yerganian

Armenian-language surnames